Renato Costa Silva, the Renatinho born in Goiânia is a Brazilian footballer, who is currently playing for Plácido de Castro.

Career
Played in the Inhumas and Atlético Goianiense.

Career statistics
(Correct )

Contract
 Atlético Goianiense.

See also
Football in Brazil
List of football clubs in Brazil

References

External links
 ogol
 soccerway

1988 births
Living people
Brazilian footballers
Sportspeople from Goiânia
Association football defenders
Atlético Clube Goianiense players